The Sweet Girl (German: Das Süße Mädel) is a 1926 German silent film directed by Manfred Noa and starring Mary Nolan, Paul Heidemann and Nils Asther. It is based on an operetta. The German title is a Viennese slang term.

The film's sets were designed by the art director Gustav A. Knauer and Hermann Warm.

Cast

References

Bibliography
 Claus Tieber & Anna Katharina Windisch. The Sounds of Silent Films: New Perspectives on History, Theory and Practice. Palgrave Macmillan, 2014.

External links

1926 films
Films of the Weimar Republic
German silent feature films
Films directed by Manfred Noa
Films based on operettas
German black-and-white films